Arve Isdal (born 28 August 1977, Bergen, Norway), also known as Ice Dale, is a Norwegian musician and producer, best known as lead guitarist for the progressive black metal band Enslaved.

Career 
Isdal was initially influenced by hard rock bands like Kiss, Led Zeppelin, and Deep Purple; and progressive rock bands like Pink Floyd and King Crimson; before discovering heavy metal. He joined his first band, the extreme metal act Malignant Eternal, in the mid 1990s and appeared on their album Alarm in 1999. He joined Enslaved in 2002, and has since appeared on nine studio albums with the band, starting with Below the Lights in 2003. He is also a member of the hard rock band Audrey Horne, for whom he plays guitar and bass. 

In 2006, Isdal participated in the black metal supergroup I and played on their album Between Two Worlds. With some other members of Enslaved plus the noise-rock group Fe-Mail, Isdal formed the side project Trinacria in 2008, which in turn released the album Travel Now Journey Infinitely. That same year, he made a guest appearance on the self-titled debut album by the glam metal band Bourbon Flame and was part of Gorgoroth's live lineup for their summer tour.

With some of his Enslaved bandmates, Isdal provided his voice for a 2009 episode of the animated series Metalocalypse. Isdal made a guest appearance on the Ov Hell album The Underworld Regime in 2010, and the following year he played on the Demonaz album March of the Norse. He continues to perform full-time with Enslaved in the 2020s.

Discography

Audrey Horne

 Confessions & Alcohol (EP, 2005)
 No Hay Banda (2005)
 Le Fol (2007)
 Audrey Horne (2010)
 Youngblood (2013)
 Pure heavy (2014)
 Blackout (2018)

Enslaved 
 Below the Lights (2003)
 Isa (2004)
 Ruun (2006)
 Vertebrae (2008)
 Axioma Ethica Odini (2010)
 RIITIIR (2012)
 In Times (2015)
 E (2017)
 Utgard (2020)
 Heimdal (2023)

I 
 Between Two Worlds (2006)

Demonaz 
 March of the Norse (2011)

Malignant Eternal 
 Alarm (1999)

Ov Hell 
The Underworld Regime (2010)

Trinacria 
Travel Now Journey Infinitely (2008)

See also

 List of Norwegian musicians
 List of heavy metal musicians
 Music of Norway

References

External links
 Ice Dale on Myspace
 
 "Arve Isdal" at groove.no

1977 births
20th-century Norwegian musicians
21st-century Norwegian musicians
Death metal musicians
Hard rock musicians
Industrial metal musicians
Living people
Musicians from Bergen
Norwegian black metal musicians
Norwegian heavy metal guitarists
Norwegian multi-instrumentalists
Norwegian record producers
Norwegian rock bass guitarists
Norwegian male bass guitarists
Norwegian songwriters
Post-grunge musicians
Progressive metal bass guitarists
Thrash metal musicians
Viking metal musicians
20th-century bass guitarists
21st-century Norwegian guitarists
Enslaved (band) members
21st-century Norwegian bass guitarists
20th-century Norwegian male musicians
21st-century Norwegian male musicians
I (band) members
Audrey Horne (band) members